Right Back at Cha is an album containing unreleased material, remixes and live performances of tracks from the debut album by Shai, ...If I Ever Fall in Love.

Track listing
"Live Introduction" - 0:55
"Yours" (a cappella) - 5:20
"Show Me" - 5:49
"Sexual (Tonight Is the Night)" - 5:19
"Together Forever" (Live) - 6:08
"Come Home to My Love" - 6:07
"Waiting for the Day" (Remix) - 4:10
"Changes" (Remix) - 4:10
"Comforter" (Smooth Mix) - 4:10
"If I Ever Fall in Love" (Live) - 6:56

Singles
"Yours"

1993 EPs
Shai (band) albums
MCA Records EPs